The 2018 Badminton Asia Team Championships were held at the Sultan Abdul Halim Stadium in Alor Setar, Malaysia, from 6 to 11 February 2018 and were organised by the Badminton Asia. This tournament also served as the Asian qualification for the 2018 Thomas & Uber Cup.

Medalists

Tournament
The 2018 Badminton Asia Team Championships officially crowned the best male and female national badminton teams in Asia and at the same time worked as the Asian qualification event towards the 2018 Thomas & Uber Cup finals. 28 teams, consisting of 15 men's teams and 13 women's teams entered the tournament.

Venue
This tournament was held at Sultan Abdul Halim Stadium in Alor Setar, Malaysia.

Seeds
The seeding were as follows:
 Men's team

 
 
 
 
 
 
 
 

 Women's team

Draw
The draw was held on 23 January 2018, at the tournament venue. The men's team group stage consisted of one group with three teams and three groups each with four teams. The women's team group stage consisted of three groups each with three teams and one group with four teams.
 Men's team

 Women's team

Squads

Men's team

Group stage

Group A

 Hong Kong vs. Singapore

 China vs. Singapore

 China vs. Hong Kong

Group B

 South Korea vs. Nepal

 Japan vs. Kazakhstan

 South Korea vs. Kazakhstam

 Japan vs. Nepal

 Nepal vs. Kazakhstan

 Japan vs. South Korea

Group C

 Malaysia vs. Thailand

 Chinese Taipei vs. Myanmar

 Malaysia vs. Myanmar

 Chinese Taipei vs. Thailand

 Chinese Taipei vs. Malaysia

 Thailand vs. Myanmar

Group D

 India vs. Philippines

 Indonesia vs. Maldives

 Indonesia vs. Philippines

 India vs. Maldives

 Indonesia vs. India

 Philippines vs. Maldives

Knockout stage

Quarterfinals

Semifinals

Final

Women's team

Group stage

Group W

 India vs. Hong Kong

 Japan vs. Hong Kong

 Japan vs. India

Group X

 Chinese Taipei vs. Maldives

 South Korea vs. Maldives

 South Korea vs. Chinese Taipei

Group Y

 Malaysia vs. Vietnam

 Thailand vs. Philippines

 Malaysia vs. Philippines

 Thailand vs. Vietnam

 Thailand vs. Malaysia

 Vietnam vs. Philippines

Group Z

 Indonesia vs. Singapore

 China vs. Singapore

 China vs. Indonesia

Knockout stage

Quarterfinals

Semifinals

Final

References

External links
 E-Plus Badminton Asia Team Championships 2018

 
Asia Champ
Badminton tournaments in Malaysia
2018 in Malaysian sport
International sports competitions hosted by Malaysia
Badminton Asia Team Championships
Badminton Asia Team Championships